Club Bàsquet Femení Universitari de Barcelona–FC Barcelona was a Spanish Catalan women's basketball team. Initially named CBF Universitari de Barcelona, belonging just to the Universitat de Barcelona, it later became part of the FC Barcelona family. They used to have four base teams: junior, cadet, infantil and infantil'91.

UB-Barça was one of the most successful teams in the Spanish League in the first half of the 2000s, winning the championship in 2003 and 2005. However, in 2007 FC Barcelona retired its sponsorship, and the club, not being able to face its expenses, was relegated and disbanded.

Notable former players include Marta Fernández, Helen Luz, Razija Mujanović and Érika de Souza.

Season by season

Trophies 

 Liga Femenina: 2 Champions''': 2002/03, 2004/05

External links 

 UB-Barça
  www.eurobasket.com

FC Barcelona
Catalan basketball teams
Women's basketball teams in Spain
Basketball teams established in 1985
Basketball teams disestablished in 2007
1985 establishments in Spain